Capital Area Transit may refer to:

 Capital Area Transit (Harrisburg), the public transit agency serving the Harrisburg, Pennsylvania, area
 Capital Area Transit (Raleigh), the public transit agency serving Raleigh, North Carolina
 Capital Area Transportation (CAT), the public transportation system in Bismarck and Mandan, North Dakota; see Bis-Man Transit

See also
 Capital Area Transportation Authority, Lansing Michigan
 Capital Area Transit System, East Baton Rouge Parish, Louisiana